Events in the year 2022 in Equatorial Guinea.

Incumbents 

 President: Teodoro Obiang Nguema Mbasogo
 Prime Minister: Francisco Pascual Obama Asue

Events 
Ongoing — COVID-19 pandemic in Equatorial Guinea

 9 September – Parliament approves to bring forward the presidential elections to November.
 19 September – Equatorial Guinea abolishes the death penalty after its president Teodoro Obiang Nguema Mbasogo signs a new penal code into law.

 November –   2022 Equatorial Guinean general election scheduled to take place.

Deaths 

 14 September –   Mariano Ondo, footballer (born 1999)

References 

 
2020s in Equatorial Guinea
Years of the 21st century in Equatorial Guinea
Equatorial Guinea
Equatorial Guinea